Myxoid chondrosarcoma is a type of chondrosarcoma. It has been associated with a t(9;22) (q22;q12) EWS/CHN gene fusion.

References

External links 

Osseous and chondromatous neoplasia